The National Republican Senate Committee (NRSC) is the Republican Hill committee for the United States Senate, working to elect Republicans to that body. The NRSC was founded in 1916 as the Republican Senatorial Campaign Committee. It was reorganized in 1948 and renamed the National Republican Senatorial Committee.

The NRSC helps elect Republican incumbents and challengers primarily through fundraising.

List of chairmen

See also 
National Republican Congressional Committee
Democratic Senatorial Campaign Committee

References

External links
 

Senatorial Committee
United States Senate
Hill committees